Will Work for Food may refer to:

A common phrase on panhandlers' signs.  

It may also refer to these following works of art and organizations. 

 Will Work for Food, 1993 album by Uncle Slam
Will Work for Food (TV series), the Food Network television series starring Adam Gertler
Will Work for Food (organization), web-based non-profit addressing severe malnutrition